Linospadix minor (also known as Bacularia intermedia), more commonly known as the minor walking stick palm (being smaller in stature than the walking stick palm Linospadix monostachyos ) is a small North-East Queensland tropical forest palm with stems between 7mm and 20mm in diameter, growing from 1 m to 5 m high, with semi-glossy dark green leaves, and a crown of 7 to 12 leaves 

The minor walking stick palm has a limited distribution in the rainforests of the southern Mcllwraith Range (Cape York Peninsula), and is most abundant in the Queensland's wet tropical forests south of Cooktown (Mount Amos area) to Mission Beach (Licuala State Forest) and as far inland as Windsor Tableland (from 0–1200 m elevation)

References

minor
Palms of Australia
Flora of Queensland